The Altar Stone is a recumbent central megalith at Stonehenge in England, dating to Stonehenge phase 3i, around 2600 BCE. It is identified as Stone 80 in scholarly articles.

Its name probably comes from a comment by Inigo Jones who wrote:
‘... whether it might be an Altar or no I leave to the judgment of others’.

Composition, origin, and situation
The Altar Stone is made of a purplish-green micaceous sandstone and is thought to have originated from outcrops of the Senni Beds formation of the Old Red Sandstone in Wales, though this has not been fully established.

Stone 55 (a sarsen megalith) lies on top of Stone 80 (Altar Stone) perpendicularly, and is thought to have fallen across it. The Altar Stone weighs approximately six tons and (if it ever was upright) would have stood nearly two metres tall. Some believe that it always was recumbent It is sometimes classed as a bluestone, because it does not have a local provenance.

Stone 80 was most recently excavated in the 1950s, but no written records of the excavation survive, and there are no samples available for examination that are established as having come from the monolith.

References

Stonehenge